Jovian Hediger (born December 17, 1990, in Reinach, Aargau) is a Swiss cross-country skier.

Hediger competed at the 2014 Winter Olympics for Switzerland. He placed 47th in the qualifying round in the sprint, failing to advance to the knockout stages.

As of April 2014, his best showing at the World Championships was 25th through the classical sprint event in 2013.

Hediger made his World Cup debut in December 2009. As of April 2014, his best finish is a sixth, in a freestyle sprint event at Toblach in 2013–14. His best World Cup overall finish is 45th, in 2020–21. His best World Cup finish in a discipline is 12th, in the 2020–21 Sprint Cup.

Cross-country skiing results
All results are sourced from the International Ski Federation (FIS).

Olympic Games

Distance reduced to 30 km due to weather conditions.

World Championships

World Cup

Season standings

Team podiums
 1 podium – (1 )

References

1990 births
Living people
People from Kulm District
Olympic cross-country skiers of Switzerland
Cross-country skiers at the 2014 Winter Olympics
Cross-country skiers at the 2018 Winter Olympics
Cross-country skiers at the 2022 Winter Olympics
Swiss male cross-country skiers
Sportspeople from Aargau
21st-century Swiss people